RTM TV1 (stylised as tv1) is a Malaysian free-to-air television channel owned and operated by Radio Televisyen Malaysia, a broadcasting department of the Malaysian Government. Launched on 28 December 1963, TV1 is the first and oldest TV station in Malaysia. The channel features mostly news, talk shows and documentaries and some in-house, local and international kids, drama and sports programming.

History
RTM TV1 began its broadcast as Televisyen Malaysia on 28 December 1963. It was the nation's sole television channel until 1969 when TV2, then Rangkaian Kedua (Second Network) began its operation and the channel became known as Rangkaian Pertama (First Network). At the same time, Televisyen Malaysia merged with Radio Malaysia to form a single broadcasting department - Radio Televisyen Malaysia.

RTM TV1 started broadcasting in colour since December 1978 in Peninsular Malaysia and 1980 in Sabah and Sarawak. During its early years, it only broadcast in the evenings, with daytime broadcasts for schools under the TV Pendidikan banner from 1972 until 1 March 1994 when daytime transmission was introduced on the channel. TV1 broadcasts 24 hours a day since 21 August 2012, more than 6 years after its sister channel did so (3 April 2006). On 1 April 2019, TV1 has started its HDTV broadcasting in conjunction of RTM's 73rd anniversary, and available exclusively through myFreeview DTT service on channel 101.

See also
 MechaTV2
 TV Okey
 Sukan RTM
 Berita RTM
 Television in Malaysia
 Radio Televisyen Malaysia

References

External links
 
 
 
 

1963 establishments in Malaysia
Television stations in Malaysia
Television channels and stations established in 1963
Malay language television stations
Radio Televisyen Malaysia